Hubertus Aegidius Hermanus "Berry" van Aerle (born 8 December 1962) is a Dutch former professional footballer who played mainly as a right back.

A tough tackler, he was best known for his spell with PSV, which he helped capture the 1988 European Cup. A Dutch international for five years, he won the Euro 1988 tournament.

Club career
Born in Helmond, North Brabant, van Aerle spent 13 years with Eredivisie giants PSV Eindhoven, helping them to five leagues. During most of his spell, he also played as a defensive midfielder as the right-back slot was occupied by veteran Belgian Eric Gerets; incidentally, the Dutchman spent one year in that country, on loan to Royal Antwerp FC.

Van Aerle played the entire final of the 1987–88 European Cup, won on penalties against S.L. Benfica after a 0–0 draw. "It wasn't a particularly good match, with both teams very cautious, but it was exciting until the end and a tense penalty shoot-out. It does not matter how you win it, just as long as you do. Now we're in the history books forever: we lifted that trophy", van Aerle told Berend Scholten on UEFA.com. After Gerets retired in 1992, he began dealing with several injuries but still managed to appear regularly, collecting more than 300 overall appearances until his departure; he was also one of five European players to ever achieve the feat of winning four competitions – three with their club and one with the national team – in the same year, the others being teammates Hans van Breukelen, Wim Kieft, Ronald Koeman and Gerald Vanenburg.

Eventually, van Aerle retired from play after one sole season with hometown's Helmond Sport. After working as a mailman in his hometown, he returned to PSV, where he served in several capacities (talent scout, supporters coordinator).

International career
Van Aerle won his first cap for the Netherlands on 14 October 1987. In the following year's UEFA European Championship, he was an undisputed starter as the national side lifted their first continental trophy, in West Germany (all matches and minutes).

In total, van Aerle appeared in 35 games in exactly five years, also being selected for the 1990 FIFA World Cup and Euro 1992. During those years, he formed an efficient fullback partnership with Adri van Tiggelen, also his clubmate in the early 90s.

Honours

Club
PSV
Eredivisie: 1985–86, 1987–88, 1988–89, 1990–91, 1991–92
KNVB Cup: 1987–88, 1988–89, 1989–90
Johan Cruijff Shield: 1992; Runner-up 1991
European Cup: 1987–88

International
Netherlands
UEFA European Championship: 1988

References

External links
Beijen profile 

1962 births
Living people
Sportspeople from Helmond
Footballers from North Brabant
Dutch footballers
Association football defenders
Association football utility players
Eredivisie players
Eerste Divisie players
PSV Eindhoven players
Helmond Sport players
Belgian Pro League players
Royal Antwerp F.C. players
Netherlands international footballers
UEFA Euro 1988 players
1990 FIFA World Cup players
UEFA Euro 1992 players
UEFA European Championship-winning players
Dutch expatriate footballers
Expatriate footballers in Belgium
Dutch expatriate sportspeople in Belgium